Marmaduke Wyvill (by 1496 – 1558), of Little Burton, Yorkshire, was an English politician.

He was a Member (MP) of the Parliament of England for Ripon in October 1553.

References

15th-century births
1558 deaths
English MPs 1553 (Mary I)
Members of the Parliament of England for constituencies in Yorkshire